Bettrechies is a commune in the Nord department in northern France.

Population

Heraldry

See also
Communes of the Nord department

References

Communes of Nord (French department)